Nadītu, or Naditu, is the designation of a legal position for women in Babylonian society and for Sumerian temple slaves.  The latter were primarily involved in business activities and were allowed to own property.

Nadītu were mainly particular women not living in the patriarchal family relations that Babylonian society regarded as normal. Nadītu lived in monastic buildings, but in general did own their home within these complexes, and were independent. They could engage in contracts, borrow money and perform other business transactions normally denied to women; records show that they were very active. Usually these women were part of the elite, often from royal families.

Their financial independence was based on their dowry, which they were not allowed to pass on to a man; the dowry was the compensation for not being included in the inheritance, as this was passed on through the patriarchal line.  It is not exactly clear whether the nadītu were allowed to marry, or whether this right was only reserved for the nadītu that belonged to the Marduk temple.  According to some sources, celibacy was required in the Shamash temples, or at the least they had to remain childless, which is reflected in the meaning of the word nadītu - the fallow. When the nadītu died, the dowry fell to her brothers or other relatives.

See also 
 Babylonian law
 Codex Hammurabi
 Qedesha

References
 

Mesopotamian priests
Ancient priestesses
Ancient Mesopotamian women
Babylonian women